Iskander Asanovich Taimanov (born 20 December 1961, Искандер Асанович Тайманов) is a Russian mathematician whose research concerns geometry, calculus of variations, and soliton theory. He is the chair of the department of geometry and topology of Novosibirsk State University. 

He is a member of the Russian Academy of Sciences.

He was a Ph.D. student of Sergey Petrovich Novikov. 

Some topics of his work are Morse–Novikov theory and Willmore surfaces.

He is the author of the textbook Lectures on Differential Geometry.

References

External links
Page at Novosibirsk State University

20th-century Russian mathematicians
21st-century Russian mathematicians
Moscow State University alumni
Textbook writers
Academic staff of Novosibirsk State University
1961 births
Living people